Narsinghpur railway station  is a railway station serving Narsinghpur city, in Narsinghpur district of Madhya Pradesh State of India. It is under Jabalpur railway division of West Central Railway Zone of Indian Railways. It is located on Jabalpur–Itarsi main line of the Indian Railways. Passenger, Express and Superfast trains halt here.

References

Jabalpur railway division
Railway stations in Narsinghpur district